Martin or Martyn Young may refer to:

 Martin Young (journalist) (born 1947), television reporter and interviewer
 Martin Young (cricketer) (1924–1993), English cricketer
 Martin Young (footballer) (born 1955), English footballer
Martyn Young, musician in Colourbox

See also
Martin Young House
Young Martin